Hawthorne Heights, formerly A Day in the Life, is an American rock band from Dayton, Ohio, formed in 2001. Their lineup currently consists of JT Woodruff (lead vocals, rhythm guitar), Matt Ridenour (bass guitar, backing vocals), Mark McMillon (lead guitar, unclean backing vocals), and Chris Popadak (drums, percussion).

On November 24, 2007, rhythm guitarist and unclean backing vocalist Casey Calvert died, leaving the band as a four-piece. In June 2014 it was announced the departure of original drummer Eron Bucciarelli. On January 20, 2015, it was announced that Micah Carli (lead guitar, unclean backing vocals) had left the band as well.

The band found success with both of their first two albums, their 2004 release, The Silence in Black and White, and their 2006 album, If Only You Were Lonely, both achieving Gold certification. Their second album additionally peaked at No. 1 on the Billboard'''s Independent Albums chart and No. 3 on the Billboard 200 charts. They are also well known for their 2006 single "Saying Sorry", which reached Gold status and peaked at No. 7 on the Billboard Hot Modern Rock Tracks chart. The band's third album, Fragile Future, was released on August 5, 2008, surprisingly through Victory Records again, after a lengthy legal battle between the two parties.

The band's fourth album Skeletons peaked at No. 50 on the Billboard 200. The band's former label, Victory, released a Hawthorne Heights "greatest hits" album, entitled Midwesterners: The Hits, on November 9, 2010. Shortly afterward, Hawthorne Heights left Wind-up Records to begin their own record label, Cardboard Empire. Via this new label, the band released an EP trilogy, beginning with Hate released August 23, 2011, and followed by Hope released June 5, 2012.

After signing with Red River Entertainment in 2013, the band postponed the release of the third EP in the trilogy, and released a full-length concept album titled Zero on June 25, 2013. The band played on the 2013 Vans Warped Tour.  In September 2015, the band released Hurt, the third EP of the trilogy. The band's sixth LP, titled Bad Frequencies followed in 2018.

Hawthorne Heights released their 7th full-length album titled The Rain Just Follows Me on September 10, 2021, via Pure Noise Records.

History
Early days (2001–2003)
A Day in the Life were formed by JT Woodruff, Jesse Blair, Andy Saunders, Josh Bethel, and Andy Lazier in Dayton, Ohio, in 2001. They took their name from the popular Beatles song "A Day in the Life".

Their first record was a demo titled Four Bullets for One Girl, which sold its 500 copy run in 2 months. This brought them to the attention of Confined Records, with which they released an album titled Nine Reasons to Say Goodbye. Finally, they released a 6-song EP titled Paper Chromatography: The Fade from Dark to Light (which was later re-released as part of the compilation From Ohio With Love)  in the winter of 2003.

In 2003, Matt Ridenour, bassist and vocal harmonies, would pass a Hotel called Hawthorn Inn & Suites on his way to work. He decided to add an e and Heights to make Hawthorne Heights. The rest of the band agreed.

The Silence in Black and White and If Only You Were Lonely (2004–2006)

Their first album The Silence in Black and White, was recorded over a four-week period, and was released in 2004. The album was slow to build sales at first; however, soon the video for the song "Ohio Is for Lovers" began getting airplay on MTV, and the band enjoyed breakout success at radio as well as a growing nationwide fan base, and the album became Victory Records' highest selling debut. The Silence in Black and White peaked at number 56 on the Billboard charts. The singles "Niki FM" and "Silver Bullet" were released in 2005.

When their second album If Only You Were Lonely was released on Feb 28, 2006, it debuted at number 3 on the Billboard charts, powered by the lead single "Saying Sorry" which has received regular airplay on MTV, VH1 and Fuse. The Legion of Doom remixed a song from the album, entitled "Where Can I Stab Myself in the Ears?" and it appeared on the Underworld: Evolution Original Motion Picture Soundtrack. The remix was re-titled "Where Do I Stab Myself in the Ears".

The band performed on the 2006 Nintendo Fusion Tour. A live CD/DVD was intended to be recorded from this tour, but was cancelled, likely due to complications with Victory.

Death of Casey Calvert (2007)
Casey Calvert, the band's rhythm guitarist, was found dead on the band's tour bus on November 24, 2007. The band had begun its American tour just the day before in Detroit, Michigan."I'm Sorry I Have to Be the One to Post This." Absolutepunk.net. November 24, 2007. Toxicology and autopsy reports stated that Calvert died of combined drug intoxication. A statement issued by the members of the band said that Calvert died in his sleep, and that his body was discovered before the band was to carry out a sound check before its show at the 9:30 Club in Washington, D.C. The members of the band spent a few days mourning, reflecting, and writing a song about the death.

This song became "Four Become One" on its album Fragile Future. The members also dedicated another song to Calvert called "Sugar in the Engine". In the end of the song, JT Woodruff can be heard speaking of Calvert. Calvert was 26 years old when he died. When the band plays old hits from either The Silence in Black and White or If Only You Were Lonely, Carli stepped in and did all of Calvert's parts, until he left the band in 2015 Mark McMillon is now the current unclean vocalist for the band.

According to the results of an autopsy performed by the office of the chief medical examiner in Washington, and released in December 2007, Calvert's death was accidental. Dr. John Mendelson, a pharmacologist at the California Pacific Medical Center Research Institute, told MTV News that "Cases like Calvert's are so rare that they're almost nonexistent. It's so rare that you can't even put a number on it," and that "It's exceedingly rare that 26-year-olds die of anything medical. This kind of death is one in several million." Both citalopram (also known by the brand name Celexa) and clonazepam (also known by the brand names Klonopin and Rivotril) are prescription drugs, the former an antidepressant and the latter used to treat seizure disorders and panic attacks.

Drummer Eron Bucciarelli issued the following statement:

From the time of the incident we suspected a possible drug interaction as the cause. Casey wrestled with depression for as long as we knew him. He saw numerous doctors and took an ever-changing array of medicines to get better. He finally had his depression under control. According to the toxicology report, the cause of death was due to a fatal interaction between depression meds, anxiety meds, and an opiate. Opiates being mentioned along with the term "substance abuse", coupled with "rockstar" stereotypes immediately conjure up images of hard drug use and addiction, which simply couldn't be further from the truth in Casey's instance. What the toxicology report doesn't show is that before our leaving for tour, Casey had a root canal, and he was prescribed Vicodin (an opiate) for the pain. Once again, Casey was not involved in anything illegal, nor was he a substance abuser.

JT Woodruff has stated that "We won't add another guitar player or add another screamer", and that "In our albums, it'll always say 'Casey Calvert: guitar/vocals.'" Bucciarelli stated in another interview that, "We don't need another screamer ... If the fans want screaming, they can provide it themselves."

Fragile Future and Rhapsody Originals (2008–2009)

Hawthorne Heights released a demo for their new song "Come Back Home" on their MySpace page in 2007. A reprised version of the song became one of the twelve tracks that were selected for the band's third studio album. A second song was released on their Myspace, a cover of the Smashing Pumpkins song "Bullet with Butterfly Wings", which was contributed to MySpace Tribute to The Smashing Pumpkins. This cover song, however, did not become a track on the album.

Hawthorne Heights and Victory Records patched up their relationship and the band's third album, Fragile Future, was released with the label on August 5, 2008. Jeff Schneeweis produced the album. The lead single "Rescue Me" was released on July 22, 2008. Hawthorne Heights played "Rescue Me" live as special guests on The Tonight Show with Jay Leno as host after the album's full release, on September 18, 2010, as promotion for Fragile Future.Rhapsody Originals was released exclusively for Rhapsody as the first EP by Hawthorne Heights on August 26, 2008. It was recorded by Rhapsody, and released as promotion for the studio album Fragile Future. It contains three live acoustic songs from Fragile Future, and one from their second studio album, If Only You Were Lonely.

Hawthorne Heights performed at Linkin Park's Projekt Revolution 2008 tour this year on the Revolution Stage with former labelmates Atreyu, Armor For Sleep, Street Drum Corps, and 10 Years. Joining Linkin Park on the Main Stage was Chris Cornell, The Bravery, Busta Rhymes, and Ashes Divide.

Skeletons and Midwesterners: The Hits (2009–2011)

Hawthorne Heights posted a blog through their MySpace profile stating that they had officially been signed to Wind-up Records, and had been writing and recording for a new record. The band revealed that while there is not a new member of the band and no replacement was made for Hawthorne Heights former vocalist, Casey Calvert, the new album would feature a new "screamer". While on tour, Hawthorne Heights announced that Micah Carli would now be providing screaming vocals for the band.

As the album was being recorded, lead singer JT Woodruff and drummer Eron Bucciarelli named two songs from the record on several occasions, leading many to believe that they would be released as singles. Acoustic versions of the two songs were also said to have been recorded. The songs are entitled "Here I Am" and "Nervous Breakdown".  "Nervous Breakdown" did become the first single from the album on March 23, 2010. On October 2, 2009, both Woodruff and Buicarelli posted updates on their Twitter pages saying that they had just finished gang vocals for the record. Woodruff stated "Just finished up doing gang vocals on a few songs. Return to hardcore!"

On October 14, an e-mail was sent out to the official mailing list telling fans that the new album would be titled Skeletons and would be released in early 2010. The e-mail stated:

Not all of the bands mentioned, however, ended up joining Hawthorne Heights for the 2009 Never Sleep Again tour.
As promised, download cards for the song "Unforgivable" were distributed while on tour. In addition, a song entitled "End of the Underground" has been performed live.

After the Never Sleep Again 2009 tour, frontman JT began performing several solo acoustic shows with songs he had written outside of Hawthorne Heights.

The track listing for the album was announced on February 5, 2010. Skeletons was released on June 1, 2010. According to JT Woodruff's February SayNow voice message (also uploaded on the band's Twitter), Micah Carli plays ukulele, mandolin, and various other "weird instruments" in the lute family for many of the bonus tracks on Skeletons.

Victory Records announced the release date for their "best of" compilation of Hawthorne Heights songs, entitled Midwesterners: The Hits. The album was released on November 9, 2010, and contains 16 songs taken from the band's first three Victory Records' studio albums.

Cardboard Empire and EP trilogy (2011–2012)

In July 2011, Hawthorne Heights parted ways with Wind-up Records and created their own record label, Cardboard Empire. The band will be self-releasing a trilogy of EPs, beginning with Hate, released August 23, 2011. Each EP will be released within four or five months of the prior release. Between releases the band will embark on various North American tours.

On August 11, 2011, the album art and track listing for Hate was revealed. The next day the band premiered one of the EP's tracks, "Four White Walls". The EP leaked onto the internet on August 21, 2011. Hawthorne Heights plans to release a music video for each track from Hate, the first for the song "Is This What You Wanted?".

On April 24, 2012, the band announced that the second EP in the trilogy, titled Hope, would be released on June 5, 2012. They also announced dates for their Summer of Hope tour, in support of the EP, which began on June 1 and will end on July 14. Their first single from Hope, entitled "New Winter", is the only song by Hawthorne Heights to be featured on MTV in almost 5 years. During their Autumn of Hope European tour, they did an interview in a bathtub.

Zero, line-up changes and Bad Frequencies (2013–2020)
It was announced that the band has signed with Red Entertainment. They released a new album titled Zero on June 25, 2013. The band played at Vans Warped Tour 2013 on all dates. It was as part of this announcement that Mark McMillon of The Story Changes was formally introduced as part of the band, though he had been a touring member for many years.

On June 1, exactly 10 years after Hawthorne Heights' debut album The Silence in Black and White was released, an acoustic version of the album was released via inVogue Records. The band embarked on a tour to celebrate the albums 10-year anniversary, kicking off the European leg in Fibber Magees, Dublin, Ireland. On June 18, it was announced that Eron Bucciarelli had parted ways from the band shortly after its release. On January 20, 2015, it was announced Micah Carli had also departed. On February 13, it was announced on the band's Facebook page that they are recording new material. The Band performed at Emo Nite LA in March 2018. Hurt, the final part of the EP trilogy was released on September 18, 2015. "Pink Hearts" was made available for streaming on March 1, 2018. The group's next album, Bad Frequencies, was released on April 27 through Pure Noise Records. The band supported Silverstein on their 15-year anniversary tour of their debut album When Broken Is Easily Fixed.

The Rain Just Follows Me (2021–present)
During their first post-pandemic tour with peers Bayside and Senses Fail, the band released their 7th full-length album titled The Rain Just Follows Me on September 10, 2021, via Pure Noise Records. The 10-song LP was produced by Grammy-winning producer Cameron Webb. The album's lead single, "Constant Dread", features guest vocals by Counterparts frontman Brendan Murphy.

Musical style and influences
The band has been referred to as hard rock and alternative rock. The band has been mainly categorized as post-hardcore,Silence in Black and White review at Decapolis emo and screamo. The band is often described as post-hardcore because this genre encompasses a wide range of musical styles, making it a general enough term to be applied to Hawthorne Heights' diverse style. Likewise, Hawthorne Heights's albums have been tagged as alternative rock by iTunes. Hawthorne Heights also have been described as indie rock, indie emo, and punk rock.

Eron Bucciarelli, the band's drummer, noted that the band's sound has "always been pigeon holed as emo or screamo". In the same interview he said that the band prefers to be referred to simply as "a rock band".

While commenting on the band's first album, The Silence in Black and White, Eron said that the "triple guitar attack" allows them to "add a lot of layering effects and intricacies to our music along with legitimately pulling in different musical styles." The album also includes feminine backing vocals provided by band member Micah Carli's sister, Graci Carli. This gave many of the songs a broader emotional spectrum not limited by gender.

Hawthorne Heights began to be recognized as melodic hardcore due to the release of If Only You Were Lonely. After "softening their lyrical stance, incorporating melancholy keyboards and adding upbeat melodies that were a perfect counterbalance to their screaming backup chants" their unique sound became more recognized.

Even after the death of one of the guitarists, Hawthorne Heights continued to allow its sound to evolve. With the release of Fragile Future, the band used elements of power pop. Hawthorne Heights' fourth album, Skeletons, stylistically reverts to "music similar to their first two albums", yet is much softer. The album, however, "refuses to stomp over old ground" by incorporating "electro" and "pop punk" elements into a few of the tracks. The album also "broke new ground by adding a unique electronica sound." In addition, various other musical styles are incorporated into Skeletons. The acclaimed blues rock track, "Gravestones," opens with "uncharacteristic western acoustics, and then delves into a more fascinating chorus, leaving the wild wild west sound and replacing it with pianos and ethereal presence."

After forming their own record label, Hawthorne Heights made plans to release a trilogy of EPs. The first of the trilogy, Hate, lyrically deals with feelings of hate, anger, and solitude. According to Woodruff, Hate features more "aggressive songs" that are "a lot heavier than anything we've ever done." The EP has been compared to other screamo albums, such as releases by Senses Fail. Screamed vocals and breakdowns are prominent features throughout the album, reflecting the musical style of the band's first two albums. One review states "this aggressive side, dormant for the past few years, has finally boiled over all at once."

Hawthorne Heights cite Sunny Day Real Estate, The Get Up Kids, Quicksand, Led Zeppelin, Youth of Today, Gorilla Biscuits, and Black Sabbath as their influences.

Controversy
Incident with Ne-Yo
In February 2006, as the band was readying the release of If Only You Were Lonely, Victory Records issued two statements to fans through the band's mailing lists as well as their MySpace profile, stating that "ROCK music needs your support" and that "the No. 1 slot belongs to us." They also pleaded with fans to go into chain stores and make sure Hawthorne Heights CDs are in stock and to sabotage the sales count of Ne-Yo's record In My Own Words, which was being released the same day. The statement said:

They ended their rallying cry by quoting Winston Churchill: "Victory at all costs, Victory in spite of all terror, Victory however long and hard the road may be; for without Victory, there is no survival."
Later, group members claimed that the statements were issued by their record label without their consent.
On August 7, 2006, the band announced they would be leaving Victory Records, and sued the label for breach of contract, copyright and trademark infringement, fraud and abuse.
Victory Records then countersued for breach of contract and libel in September 2006.
In October 2006, a Chicago judge dismissed two of the three main claims in the band's suit, ruling that the trademark and copyright violation allegations were unsound.
On March 5, 2007, a federal judge in Chicago ruled that Victory Records does not hold exclusive rights for the band's recording services and that the band can record for any label. Specifically, the Judge stated: "The agreement contains no exclusivity provision, nor does any of its language appear to prevent [the band] from recording elsewhere during the life of the agreement".
The judge later reaffirmed this ruling on May 17, 2007, stating that Hawthorne Heights is still contractually bound to deliver two albums to Victory, but may record albums which are released elsewhere.

Wild Justice Records lawsuit
On October 16, 2007, Wild Justice Records sued Hawthorne Heights for breach of an oral contract, stemming from a dispute over the management company's share of the band's revenues.

Band members

Current members
 James Thomas "JT" Woodruff – lead vocals, rhythm guitar, piano, keyboards (2001–present)
 Matt Ridenour – bass, backing vocals (2001–present)
 Mark McMillon – lead guitar, unclean vocals (2015–present); rhythm guitar, backing vocals (2013–2015, touring and session 2009–2013)
 Chris "Poppy" Popadak – drums, percussion, backing vocals (2017–present, touring and session 2014–2017)

Former members
 Micah Carli – lead guitar (2001–2015); unclean vocals (2001–2002, 2008–2015)
 Eron Bucciarelli – drums, percussion (2001–2014)
 Casey Calvert – rhythm guitar, unclean vocals (2002–2007; his death)

Former touring and session musicians
 Grace Carli – female backing vocals on The Silence in Black and White (2004) and Midwesterners: The Hits (2004)
 John Bender – backing vocals on If Only You Were Lonely (2005)
 Sebastian Davin – piano on If Only You Were Lonely (2005)

Timeline

Discography

Studio albumsThe Silence in Black and White (2004)If Only You Were Lonely (2006)Fragile Future (2008)Skeletons (2010)Zero (2013)Bad Frequencies (2018)The Rain Just Follows Me'' (2021)

See also
The Great American Beast

References

External links

 Official website

Musical groups established in 2001
Musical quintets
2001 establishments in Ohio
American emo musical groups
Victory Records artists
American post-hardcore musical groups
American screamo musical groups
Musical groups from Dayton, Ohio
Wind-up Records artists
Pure Noise Records artists
American punk rock groups
Alternative rock groups from Ohio